Crossfire is a board game created by the Milton Bradley Company in 1971.  The object of the game is to score goals by pushing one of the two pucks into the opposing player's goal. This task is accomplished by shooting small metal ball bearings at the pucks using the attached guns. The earliest version of the game featured a flat board, whereas the 90's release board is dome-shaped. This causes the ball bearings to roll into the players' bins more easily, but can cause the pucks to indefinitely rest at the edges of the board. The 2010's rerelease changed this to being sloped with a shallow grade, preventing the pucks from sliding on their own as much and making it easier to get them away from the borders.

Gameplay
The two pucks are made of plastic and rest on a central metal ball bearing. The bearing can spin and roll within the plastic mold allowing greater puck movement and responsiveness to hits. One of the pucks is shaped like a triangle, and the other is star-shaped. The object of the game is to get either piece into your opponents' goal. the first to three “goals” wins.

Marketing
The early 1990s American commercial campaign for this product may be arguably its better-known aspect, portraying the game featured in a supposed near post-apocalyptic future, with the game used for a battle between two young men as "the ultimate challenge". The hero in the exchange was portrayed by a young Tim Maynard, a Shakespearean actor who transitioned into daytime soap opera acting.

References

External links

Tabletop games
Board games introduced in 1971
Board games of physical skill
Milton Bradley Company games